Michalis Tremopoulos (born 3 March 1958, in Serres) is a Greek lawyer, journalist, environmentalist and politician. He was a Member of European Parliament (MEP) from  2009 until Feb 2012.

He graduated in law at the Aristotle University of Thessaloniki in 1991, and in social ecology at the Goddard College in Vermont in 1993. He worked as a TV, radio and newspaper journalist.

He is a founding member of Ecologists Greens party. He won a seat in the European parliament in the 2009 EP elections.

External links
 

1958 births
Living people
People from Serres
Greek journalists
Greek environmentalists
Ecologist Greens MEPs
MEPs for Greece 2009–2014